A reef is a bar of rock, sand, coral or similar material, lying beneath the surface of water.

Reef may also refer to:

Earth science
 Coral reef, a type of reef that is formed by coral
 Gold reef, a synonym for a gold vein

Places
  (Portuguese for "reef"), capital of the Brazilian state of Pernambuco
 Reef, a small village in Uig, Lewis, Scotland

People
 Reef the Lost Cauze, an American rapper

Arts, entertainment, and media
 Reef (band), a British band
 Reef (novel), a 1994 novel written by Romesh Gunesekera

Other uses
 Reef (company), an American apparel and shoe company
 Reef knot, a kind of knot
 Reefing, an action performed on sails to reduce the area on which the wind can act

See also
 The Reef (disambiguation)
 Wreath